Thomas Anthony Brake (born 6 May 1962) is a British Liberal Democrat politician. He was the Member of Parliament (MP) for Carshalton and Wallington in London from 1997 to 2019.

He was appointed Director of the cross party pressure group Unlock Democracy in October 2020.

Early life
Brake was born in Melton Mowbray and moved to France when he was eight. He was educated at the Lycée International school in Saint-Germain-en-Laye in the western suburbs of Paris, and Imperial College London, where he obtained a BSc in Physics in 1983. He was a computer software consultant with Hoskyns (Capgemini) from 1983 until his election to the UK Parliament in 1997.

Political career

Early career
Brake was actively involved in human rights issues as a student. He was elected as a councillor in the London Borough of Hackney in 1988, leaving the council in 1990. In 1994 Brake was elected as a councillor in the London Borough of Sutton and sat on the council until 1998.

Brake stood for election to Parliament at the 1992 general election in Carshalton and Wallington, but was defeated by Conservative Nigel Forman.

Parliamentary career
In what proved to be a close contest, Brake was elected at the 1997 general election as the Liberal Democrat MP for Carshalton and Wallington, beating Nigel Forman with a majority of 2,267, and remained MP there until he lost the seat at the 2019 general election. He made his maiden speech on 10 June 1997. Brake defeated Conservative Ken Andrew in 2001, 2005 and again in 2010 with an increased majority. In 2015 his majority was reduced to 1,510, narrowly ahead of Conservative Matthew Maxwell-Scott.

After the 1997 election, party leader Paddy Ashdown placed Brake on the frontbench as a spokesman on the Environment, Transport and the Regions. Following the 2001 General Election, then party leader Charles Kennedy appointed him a spokesman on Transport, Local Government and the Regions. In 2002 he became a Transport spokesman. He joined the Liberal Democrat frontbench team in 2003 as the lead International Development spokesman. After the 2005 General Election he became the Transport spokesman. He was relieved of this position under the new leadership of Sir Menzies Campbell in March 2006, and later that year became spokesperson for local government. In 2007 Brake became spokesperson for London and the Olympics. In 2008 he was also appointed as a Home Affairs spokesperson.

In June 2010 Brake was named Co-Chair of the new Liberal Democrat Backbench Committee on Home Affairs, Justice and Equalities. Brake Co-Chaired the committee alongside Baroness Hamwee and Lord Thomas of Gresford OBE QC.

In September 2010 Brake attempted to introduce a bill "to amend the Freedom of Information Act 2000 to remove provisions permitting Ministers to overrule decisions of the Information Commissioner and Information Tribunal; to limit the time allowed for public authorities to respond to requests involving consideration of the public interest; to amend the definition of public authorities; and for connected purposes."

On 11 June 2011, it was announced Brake would be appointed a Privy Counsellor in the Queen's 2011 Birthday Honours list.

On 4 September 2012 he was appointed Deputy Leader of the House of Commons, replacing Liberal Democrat David Heath MP who was promoted to Minister of State in DEFRA. Before he was appointed Deputy Leader of the House of Commons, Brake was the Secretary of the All-Party Group for World Government, Treasurer of the All-Party Human Rights group, a member of the Franco British Parliamentary Relations group.

Between 2014 and 2015, Brake was an Assistant Whip for HM's Treasury. In January 2015, Brake was appointed to the Liberal Democrat General Election Cabinet as the party's Leader of the House of Commons and London spokesperson.

On 29 July 2015, Brake was named as foreign affairs spokesperson and party chief whip.

In June 2017, Brake was appointed as a Liberal Democrat spokesperson for international trade and European affairs.

In an interview with British-American centrist Owen Prell, who was visiting on behalf of Unite America, in Brake's Westminster office in June 2017, Brake greatly attributed the inability of his party to perform better in House of Commons elections to first-past-the-post.

Brake lost his seat in the 2019 general election to Elliot Colburn of the Conservative Party.

Subsequent career
In October 2020, Brake was appointed as the new director of Unlock Democracy, an organisation which campaigns for a more participatory democracy in Britain, founded upon a written constitution.  He has said that new rules should be introduced to require MPs to publish employment agreements linked to their political activities, and meanwhile should make the information available on a voluntary basis.

He is an honorary associate of the National Secular Society.

References

External links

 Tom Brake MP official site
 Profile at the Liberal Democrats

 Contributor page at The Guardian

|-

1962 births
Liberal Democrats (UK) MPs for English constituencies
Living people
Members of the Privy Council of the United Kingdom
People from Melton Mowbray
Councillors in the London Borough of Hackney
Councillors in the London Borough of Sutton
UK MPs 1997–2001
UK MPs 2001–2005
UK MPs 2005–2010
UK MPs 2010–2015
UK MPs 2015–2017
UK MPs 2017–2019
Liberal Democrats (UK) councillors